Mount Archer may refer to:
 Mount Archer, Queensland (Rockhampton Region) is a mountain and place in Central Queensland, Australia.
 Mount Archer, Queensland (Somerset Region) is a mountain and place in South-East Queensland, Australia.
 Mount Archer National Park is a national park in Central Queensland, Australia.